Coweb is a 2009 Hong Kong martial arts film directed by Xiong Xin Xin. It is Xiong Xin Xin's debut as a director in this film starring newcomer Jiang Lui Xia, Sam Lee, and Eddie Cheung.

Plot
A martial arts Instructor is recruited as a bodyguard for an extremely powerful couple. On her first day of duty, her employers are kidnapped. As she searches for the couple, she is led into the deadly world of underground fighting by cryptic messages from the kidnappers, who put her in the ring. There, her martial arts skills are tested, and she gets a few steps closer to freeing her clients. The next opponent that enters the ring will have her facing the ultimate challenge - with hopes of getting out of the ring alive.

Cast
 Jiang Luxia
 Sam Lee
 Eddie Cheung
 Kane Kosugi
 Mike Möller
 Edison Chen (Guest role)
 Tseng Pei-Yu
 Power Chan
 Wanja Götz
 Eskindir Tesfay
 Courtney Wu
 Xiong Xin Xin (Brief Appearance, Club Manager)

Production
The film wasn't easy to put together for Xiong Xin Xin. His film was turned down by several studios while some approved of the script, none of them wants to risk it with a newcomer Jiang Lui Xia as female lead. With support from producer Joe Ma and Eddie Chan, Xiong Xin Xin formed his own studio with limited budget and resources, finished filming Coweb.

International Release
On 11 June 2013, Coweb was released on Region 1 DVD by Lionsgate under the title Ninja Masters. Despite the name change there are no ninja featured in the movie. The Lionsgate release also includes a making of special feature that includes interviews with cast and crew as well as a behind the scenes look at some of the fights.

References

External links
 
 
 Coweb at the Hong Kong Movie Database

2009 films
2000s Cantonese-language films
2009 action films
Hong Kong martial arts films
2000s Hong Kong films